Paul Bruce Carpenter (February 24, 1928 – January 24, 2002) was an American psychologist and politician.

Early life 

Born in Sioux City, Iowa, Carpenter attended the University of Iowa and received a doctorate degree in experimental psychology from Florida State University. He moved to Orange County, California in 1960 and worked as a psychologist.

Political career 
He was involved with the Democratic Party. From 1974 to 1976, Carpenter served in the California State Assembly. He then served in the California State Senate from 1976 to 1986. In 1982, Carpenter ran for the Democratic Party nomination for U.S. Senate, but lost to then-governor Jerry Brown. Carpenter also served on the California Board of Equalization from 1987 to 1990. Despite being convicted of corruption charges in 1990, he won re-election to the board but was barred from serving because of the conviction.

Carpenter led his Senate caucus' election fund-raising work from 1980 to 1985, which led to accusations of corruption. In 1990, Carpenter was convicted of racketeering, conspiracy, and extortion as part of the BRISPEC sting operation. He fled to Costa Rica before sentencing - which he claimed was for prostate cancer treatment - and was subsequently extradited to the United States. He served his prison term from 1995 until 1999.

Later life 
Carpenter's only child, Jana Carpenter-Koklich (born January 1, 1960), went missing from her home in Lakewood, California in August 2001 and has never been found. Her husband Bruce Koklich was later convicted of her murder.

For many years, Carpenter lived in Cypress, California. Carpenter died of cancer in 2002 at his home in San Antonio, Texas, where he had been living since 1999.

References

External links
Join California Paul B. Carpenter

1928 births
2002 deaths
People from Cypress, California
Politicians from Iowa City, Iowa
People from San Antonio
University of Iowa alumni
Florida State University alumni
20th-century American psychologists
Democratic Party California state senators
Democratic Party members of the California State Assembly
California politicians convicted of crimes
20th-century American politicians